Sozak is a district of Turkistan Region in southern Kazakhstan. The administrative center of the district is the selo of Sholakkorgan. Population:    It contains the titular village of Sozak.

Geography
The Ashchykol Depression is located in the district. The archaeological remains of the ancient Kumkent fortification are located to the southwest of Kumkent village, near lake Kyzylkol.

References

Districts of Kazakhstan
Turkistan Region